The Reaper (Spanish: La parka) is a 2013 biographical documentary film by Gabriel Serra Argüello about Efrain Jimenez Garcia, a slaughterhouse worker who has been killing 500 bulls a day, six days a week, for the past 25 years. The Reaper was a nominee for the Academy Award for Best Documentary (Short Subject) at the 87th Academy Awards.

The film recounts how Efrain first started working in the slaughterhouse and how constantly being around death has begun to take its toll on him, with nightmares about the tables being turned and animals taking revenge on him.

Awards and nominations

References

External links
 

2013 films
2013 short documentary films
Mexican short documentary films
Documentary films about death
Documentary films about animal rights
2010s Mexican films